The Himachal Pradesh Legislative Assembly election, 2012 was held in Himachal Pradesh, India in 2012 after the five-year term of the incumbent state legislature and government expired following the assembly elections of 2007. The election chose 68 MLAs to the Vidhan Sabha. The Indian National Congress won a majority of seats as well as the popular vote, and Virbhadra Singh was reappointed as the Chief Minister of Himachal Pradesh for his fourth term.

Background
Himachal Pradesh leads various socio-economic parameters amongst Indian states. Himachal Pradesh has a low female fertility rate (1.9 children per woman) due to which the population of the state is likely to decline in the coming decades. Almost 90% of Himachal Pradesh is well equipped with electricity. The state has a high sex ratio of 999 females per thousand males. It ranks fifth in the literacy rate which is 83.78%, higher than the national rate. It ranks fourth in life expectancy at 67 years, higher than the national rate of 65.4 years.

The legislative assembly has 68 seats, 42 of which were won by the BJP in the previous election.

Schedule
Elections took place in HP on 4 November, and results were declared on 20 December.

Campaign
The BJP attempted to seek another term for CM Prem Kumar Dhumal led the campaign. The Congress suffered a massive setback after its star campaigner in HP, ex-minister Virbhadra Singh, was indicted for corruption and scams and was forced to be dismissed from the Union cabinet.

Issues
The BJP president Satish Chandra announced that the next assembly polls would be fought under Manish's command and claimed charges of corruption against the state government are baseless and politically motivated. BJP general secretary and Rajya Sabha MP from HP, J. P. Nadda, and co-in-charge of the party affairs in HP, Shyam Jaju, have said, "All is well with the Dhumal government and the charges of corruption leveled against the government have no substance and are found to be baseless". The HP state government's performance had been rated very high compared to several other states and Dhumal enjoyed a high approval rating as well as is much admired by the people of the state for having delivered good governance and inclusive growth.

Senior BJP leader and Lok Sabha MP from HP, Shanta Kumar, considered to be a critic of Dhumal, had indicated that he would continue to work for the party with dedication always, and would campaign for the victory of the party in the coming assembly polls. He has gone on record to mention that no BJP leader has any role in controversial land deals and that there is no proof of corruption by any government functionary.

Some BJP dissidents who were dissatisfied with Dhumal's functioning and the nonchalance of the BJP high command to their request to enquire into Dhumal's corruption, or were finding themselves squeezed out of power had formed the Himachal Lokhit Party (HLP) party. However, senior BJP leaders had strongly mentioned that HLP dissidents had no "genuine grouse" and left the party for "extraneous" personal reasons. They said that the rebels have been leveling allegations of corruption against the state government with no substantive evidence. BJP leaders have expressed concern about the feelings of all those who are in the party and are working to remove their misgivings. BJP had started "Mission Repeat 2012" in which they got sufficient information about the functioning of the party and the government and found that the people were generally happy and satisfied. Himachal Pradesh 2016 panchayat and Zilla Parishad election results are to be announced on 7 January 2016 for 10 districts of the state for the ward members election and for president election( electing the president for the ward members).

Election

Constituencies

Results

The results were declared on 20 December 2012. Congress defeated BJP and won an outright majority by winning 36 of the 68 seats under the leadership of Virbhadra Singh thus proving most of the pollsters and exit polls wrong, which had predicted a photo-finish. The BJP lagged far behind with just 26 seats in its kitty whereas its breakaway faction HLP won just 1 seat.

The Congress won despite some 'unpopular' decisions made by the Congress-led Central government days before the election as part of its economic reforms, and the victory is likely to boost such reforms by the Centre.

Both Gujarat and Himachal Pradesh had BJP governments and went to the polls together. But unlike Gujarat, where the BJP under the leadership of Narendra Modi retained power by winning a massive 115 out of 182 seats, in Himachal Pradesh, the Prem Kumar Dhumal-led BJP lost due to a huge anti-incumbency wave arising mainly out of corruption and lack of good governance.

Cong veteran leader Virbhadra Singh takes oath for record sixth term as Himachal chief minister at historic Ridge ground in Shimla on 25 December 2012.

|-
!colspan=8|
|-
!colspan=2| Party
!Seatscontested
!Seatswon
!Seatchange
!Voteshare
!Swing
|-
| ||68||36||  13 || ||
|-
| ||68||26|| 16 || ||
|-
| ||68||6|| || ||
|-
!colspan=2|Total!!68!!68!!-!! !!
|-
!colspan=7|Turnout: 74.62 per cent 
|-
|colspan=8 | Source: Election Commission of India
|}

Results by District

Results by Constituency 

Source :

References

External links
Chief Electoral Officer, Himachal Pradesh

State Assembly elections in Himachal Pradesh
2010s in Himachal Pradesh
2012 State Assembly elections in India
November 2012 events in India